Felice Piccolo (born 27 August 1983) is an Italian former footballer who played as a defender.

Career

Juventus & various loans
Piccolo started his football career with the Juventus youth team, although he did not make any appearances for the side and was loaned out to Serie C1 Tuscan side Lucchese in order to gain some first team experience. Piccolo scored once for the club and took part in 24 games.

The 2003–04 season saw the player farmed out once more, this time to Serie B side Como (in co-ownership deal), being a regular in their first team and playing 35 times. As part of a co-ownership deal, Piccolo moved to Reggina the next year, for €1.25M.

He then spent a brief spell on loan at Lazio in Serie A during 2005–06. Piccolo then returned to Juventus after the co-ownership deal with Reggina was resolved in Juve's favour for undisclosed fees. He was offered a 2-year deal which last until June 2008. In the 2006–07 Serie B campaign for the bianconeri, Piccolo played a total of seven matches.

Empoli and Chievo
In July 2007, half of Piccolo's registration rights was sold to Empoli F.C. for €125K. Teammate Claudio Marchisio also joined the club. In summer 2008, Empoli gained full ownership for €300K.

After played once for Empoli at the start of season, he moved to Chievo on loan, in exchange with Angelo Antonazzo.

CFR Cluj loan 
On 12 February 2010 Chievo loaned the defender out, until the end of season to CFR Cluj.

On 22 June, it was announced that Piccolo was signed by CFR Cluj outright.

Spezia and Alessandria 
On 1 September 2014, the last market day of the summer session, back in Italy by agreeing with the Spezia.

Since the summer of 2016 was acquired by the Alessandria.

Honours

Player
Honored as Juventus player
 Juventus
 Serie B: 2006–07

 CFR Cluj
 Romanian Championship League: 2009–10, 2011–12
 Romanian Cup: 2009–10
 Romanian Supercup: 2010

References

External links

1983 births
Living people
Sportspeople from the Province of Naples
Italian footballers
Italy under-21 international footballers
Italy youth international footballers
Association football defenders
Juventus F.C. players
S.S.D. Lucchese 1905 players
Como 1907 players
Reggina 1914 players
S.S. Lazio players
Empoli F.C. players
CFR Cluj players
Spezia Calcio players
U.S. Alessandria Calcio 1912 players
Serie A players
Serie B players
Serie C players
Liga I players
Italian expatriate footballers
Expatriate footballers in Romania
Footballers from Campania